Football Club de Vesoul is a French association football team founded in 1921.

History 
They are based in Vesoul, France and are currently playing in the Championnat de France Amateurs Group A. They play at the Stade René Hologne in Vesoul, which has a capacity of 6,000.

Current squad 

As of 6 December 2012.

Notable players 

  Cédric Si Mohamed (one cap for the Algeria national team)
  Jacques Olivier Etonde-Ebelle (two caps for the Cameroon national team)
  Pape Mamadou Diouf (four caps for the Senegal national team)
  Affo Erassa (four caps for the Togo national team)

Notes

External links
 FC Vesoul Official Website

Sport in Vesoul
Association football clubs established in 1921
1921 establishments in France
Football clubs in Bourgogne-Franche-Comté